Jan Mølby (born 4 July 1963) is a Danish former professional footballer and manager. As a player, he was a midfielder from 1982 to 1998. After starting his career with Kolding, he moved on to Ajax before spending twelve years playing in England with Liverpool. He was capped 33 times by Denmark, scoring twice.

After leaving Liverpool he became player-manager of Swansea City, where he spent two years, and then managed Kidderminster Harriers, guiding them to promotion to the Football League in 2000. He later had a brief spell as manager of Hull City and then a brief spell back in charge of Kidderminster Harriers.

Club career
Born in Kolding, Mølby started his senior playing career at Kolding IF, the biggest football club of his hometown, where he became team captain at the age of 18, before joining AFC Ajax on 1 July 1982, where he won the Dutch Championship and the Dutch Cup (the double) in the 1982–83 season.

Liverpool manager Joe Fagan invited Mølby to have a ten-day trial and finally signed him on 22 August 1984. He made his debut three days later on 26 August in the 3–3 league draw with Norwich City at Carrow Road. His first goal for Liverpool came on 1 December 1984 in the 3–1 league defeat to Chelsea at Stamford Bridge. He failed to shine for Liverpool in his first season as the team endured a comparatively poor season, failing to win a major trophy for the first time since 1975.

In 1985–86, new player-manager Kenny Dalglish put faith in Mølby, installing him as a regular in the first team. On a number of occasions, Mølby began matches as a third central defender or deep-lying sweeper, before moving into midfield alongside Steve McMahon, often with devastating effect, as the match wore on. He scored 21 goals in 1985–86 from midfield in what was undoubtedly his best season. The season culminated in a man of the match performance in the first-ever all Merseyside FA Cup final playing a part in all three Liverpool goals.

Having lost the league title to Liverpool a week earlier, derby rivals Everton were looking for revenge and took a 1–0 lead into the half-time break, courtesy of a Gary Lineker strike. After the break Liverpool, led by Mølby, began to make inroads into the Blues' defence. In the 57th minute he set up the equaliser for Ian Rush and followed that up six minutes later by setting up Craig Johnston to take the lead. Mølby was also involved in the third goal, when Rush latched on to a chipped pass from Ronnie Whelan to put the final out of Everton's reach and complete the double.

Mølby also began to establish himself as a regular and successful penalty taker around this time, starting with two penalties converted at home to Tottenham Hotspur in the league on 28 September 1985. Other fine performances included a brace in open play in a 3–0 home win over Aston Villa in the league on 7 December, and two goals (one a penalty) as they eliminated Manchester United from the Football League Cup in a 2–1 win at Anfield in late November.	

He remained a regular in the team in 1986–87, in which Liverpool finished second in the League. During their League Cup run, which ended with a 2–1 defeat at Wembley against Arsenal, he scored a hat-trick of penalties in a fourth round replay at Anfield against Coventry City. Mølby scored another penalty against Coventry in a league match at Anfield the following Saturday.

During pre-season training in the summer of 1987, Mølby suffered a foot injury, which turned out to be a crucial turning point in his career. He missed the first three months of the 1987–88 season, and with the arrival of John Barnes to play on the left wing, Mølby's place in central midfield was taken by Ronnie Whelan (who had hitherto played left midfield). Whelan's partnership with McMahon proved a great success and, although Whelan was himself injured later in the season, Mølby's return to fitness came too late to resume his place in midfield, which went to Nigel Spackman for the rest of the season. He was never again an automatic choice in midfield under Dalglish as Whelan and McMahon became the first choice partnership.

In 1988–89, Mølby returned to regular first team football, playing in central defence in the absence of the injured Alan Hansen, and scoring the winning goal against Manchester United at Anfield in the second league game of the season. However, in October 1988 he was sentenced to three months' imprisonment for reckless driving following an incident earlier in the year. The club decided to stand by him, and he returned to the first team in January 1989 in Hansen's continued absence, but suffered another injury in March which kept him out for the rest of the season. In April 1989, Mølby, along with his teammates, rallied round the bereaved families of the Hillsborough disaster attending a number of the funerals.

In the following season, 1989–90 (Liverpool's last title-winning season before winning again in the 2020 season), Mølby was a frustrated figure, unable to command a first team place despite often impressing during his occasional appearances. He started only 12 of 38 league games, although he enjoyed a successful return to the team in the championship run-in, deputising for the injured Whelan.

The following season threatened more of the same for Mølby, as he was again a regular substitute. In September 1990, before an away league match against Everton, Radio 5 Live commentator Mike Ingham remarked that "Mølby's still only a substitute even though he'd probably walk into any other first division team". Later that season, after Liverpool had knocked Brighton out of the FA Cup, Brighton manager Barry Lloyd expressed bemusement in a BBC post-match interview that Mølby was not being selected regularly. Mølby was very close to signing for Johan Cruyff's  F.C. Barcelona in November 1990, after a fee had been agreed of £1.6 million and he had agreed a four-year contract. When he scored a penalty in a 4–0 home win over Luton Town it was expected to be his farewell to the Liverpool fans. However, this was followed by a breakdown in negotiations and he remained at Anfield. It would be more than five years before he finally did leave the club.

Another injury to Whelan in a home league game against Everton in February 1991 gave Mølby another chance to re-establish himself, and he enjoyed his longest run of matches for four years. He once again became the club's regular penalty taker that season, scoring from all eight of his spot-kicks. However, after injury to McMahon and the surprise resignation of Dalglish, Liverpool could only finish runners-up in the league, despite having won their first nine matches of the campaign.

After initially extolling Mølby's virtues, new manager Graeme Souness changed his mind early in the 1991–92 season, leaving Mølby out as Whelan and McMahon again started in midfield. However, after Whelan suffered another injury, he turned to Mølby, who went on to feature heavily in the Liverpool side that season, starring in the UEFA Cup and playing an important part in their FA Cup winning season.

After suffering an injury in a 2–2 Premier League draw against Manchester United at Old Trafford on 18 October 1992, Mølby's career began to decline. He had suffered from fluctuating weight for most of his career, routinely gaining weight when injured and unable to train. This led to longer recovery periods being required, so his injuries generally led to an absence of at least 3 months. Over the first three Premier League seasons (Mølby's last), he started just over 30 games in total and all his goals came from penalties, including one in Liverpool's first game of the 1994–95 season when Mølby opened the scoring with a penalty in a 6–1 away win against Crystal Palace at Selhurst Park.

Early in the 1995–96 season, manager Roy Evans loaned him out to Barnsley and Norwich (where he scored once in the League Cup against Birmingham City), and in February 1996, he finally called time on more than a decade at Liverpool to take over as player-manager of Swansea City. Just before taking the job at the Vetch Field, Ron Atkinson unsuccessfully tried to sign him for Coventry City. At that stage, still only 32, he was the youngest manager of any Football League or Premier League club.

While at Liverpool, he scored a total of 62 goals, 42 of which were from penalties. During Mølby's time with Liverpool, he only failed to score three times from the penalty spot (penalties against Sheffield Wednesday and QPR in 1985–86 and Chelsea in 1989–90 were saved). His record as a penalty-taker in the top flight is thought to be second only to Matthew Le Tissier. He held the club record of most penalties scored by a Liverpool player until Steven Gerrard surpassed his record in August 2014.

International career
Mølby made his debut in the Danish international side at the age of 18, against Norway on 15 June 1982. He won 33 caps for Denmark from 1982 to 1990, scoring two goals. He was a squad player (appearing generally as a substitute) with the Danish international side which competed in the 1984 European Championship and 1986 World Cup. Competition for places in the Danish midfield often saw Mølby overlooked in favour of Frank Arnesen and Jens-Jørn Bertelsen.

Jan Mølby's international career came to an end when Richard Møller Nielsen took over as Denmark manager in 1990. The new national manager only used Mølby in two games – both in 1990. Once as a substitute in a friendly against Wales and later in the starting line-up in the 2–0 home defeat against Yugoslavia in the qualification for the Euro 1992.

Managerial career
Mølby became manager of Swansea City in February 1996 but was sacked in October 1997 along with his assistant, Billy Ayre. He had taken Swansea to the Division Three playoff final five months earlier, but they lost to a last-minute goal by Northampton's John Frain. A dismal start to the 1997–98 season had seen Swansea struggling near the foot of the Football League, and the board decided that it was time for a new manager to be appointed, asserting that the team's good performances the previous season were more down to Mølby's qualities as a top class player, rather than as a manager.

No offers of managerial jobs were forthcoming for some time. Pursuing a career as a TV pundit, Mølby was finally offered the manager's job at Kidderminster Harriers, then in the Football Conference. He took over in April 1999. Utilising the existing squad of players, but adding his own in a few key positions (ex-Liverpool teammate Mike Marsh was drafted in to great success) Harriers won the Conference title (and promotion to the Football League) in Mølby's first season in charge.

Two seasons of decent Division Three form followed, before overtures from Hull City prompted Mølby's departure for East Yorkshire. His tenure was brief however, as internal strife cast a shadow over his brief term in charge. A return to Kidderminster in October 2003 was unsuccessful, ending with his resignation a year later. Kidderminister were relegated back to the Conference that season and have yet to reclaim their Football League place.

Following Kenny Jackett's resignation as Swansea manager in early 2007, Mølby was linked with a return to the club. However, Mølby has responded by saying that he is unlikely to ever return to football management.

Recent years
In April 2009, Mølby was made an 'Honorary Scouser' by the Lord Mayor of Liverpool.

Mølby appears on a podcast called "Mølby on the Spot" presented by Trevor Downey from a field in rural Ireland.

Career statistics

Club

International

Honours

Player

Ajax
Eredivisie: 1982–83
KNVB Cup: 1982–83

Liverpool
Football League First Division:  1985–86, 1987–88, 1989–90
FA Cup: 1985–86, 1991–92
FA Charity Shield: 1986, 1988, 1989

Swansea City
Football League Third Division play-offs runner-up: 1997

Individual
PFA Team of the Year: 1996–97 Third Division

Manager
Kidderminster Harriers
Football Conference: 1999–2000

References

External links

 Official website
 
 Player profile at LFChistory.net
 
 
 Career information at ex-canaries.co.uk

1963 births
Living people
People from Kolding
Danish men's footballers
Denmark under-21 international footballers
Denmark international footballers
Association football midfielders
AFC Ajax players
Liverpool F.C. players
Barnsley F.C. players
Norwich City F.C. players
Eredivisie players
Premier League players
English Football League players
UEFA Euro 1984 players
1986 FIFA World Cup players
Danish football managers
Swansea City A.F.C. managers
Kidderminster Harriers F.C. managers
Hull City A.F.C. managers
English Football League managers
National League (English football) managers
Danish expatriate men's footballers
Danish expatriate sportspeople in the Netherlands
Danish expatriate sportspeople in England
Danish expatriate sportspeople in Wales
Expatriate footballers in the Netherlands
Expatriate footballers in England
Expatriate footballers in Wales
Danish poker players
Expatriate football managers in England
Expatriate football managers in Wales
Danish expatriate football managers
Kolding IF players
Sportspeople convicted of crimes
FA Cup Final players